Berny–Ignatius is an Indian musical duo consisting of brothers Berny and Ignatius Puthenveettil. Primarily working in the Malayalam film industry, they are best known for their work in films such as Thenmavin Kombath, Chandralekha, Kottaram Veettile Apputtan, Kalyanaraman, Chess, and Kaaryasthan.
Thenmavin Kombath earned them the Kerala State Film Award for Best Music Director in 1994.

Biography 
Born to John Puthenveettil and Treasa, Berny and Ignatius learned music from their father at an early age prior to professionally composing music in 1979. They have composed many hit songs such as Kallipoonguyile, Mayilay Parannu Vaa, Poonilamazha peythirangiya, Kathayile Rajakumaranum, Aavani Ponnoonjal, Thamarappoovil vazhum, Puthumazhayayi vannu, Ponnitta Pettakam, Thechippoove Thenagasi Poove, Oru Kathilola etc.

Awards
Kerala State Film Awards
 1994 – Best Music Director – Thenmavin Kombath

Kaumudi Awards
 1994 – Best Music Director – Thenmavin Kombath

Other Awards
 2011 – Aimfill Inspire award for Best Music Director – Marykkundoru Kunjaadu
 2010 – Jaycee foundation award for Best Music Director – Kaaryasthan

Filmography

As music directors

 Aakasha Ganga 2(2019)
 Welcome to Central Jail (2016)
 Rajadhi Raja (2014)
 Maryade (2014)
 Sringaravelan (2013)
 Climax (2013)
 Cowboy (2012)
 Perinoru Makan (2012)
 Mayamohini (2012)
 Lucky Jokers (2011)
 Marykkundoru Kunjaadu (2010)
 Kaaryasthan (2010)
 Twenty:20 (2008)
 Hareendran Oru Nishkalankan (2007)
 Chess (2006)
 Vettam (2004)
 C. I. Mahadevan 5 Adi 4 Inchu (2004)
 Anuvadhamillathe (2006)
 Thudakkam (2004)
 Pulival Kalyanam (2003)
 Uthara (2003)
 Kalyanaraman (2002)
 Kanalkkireedam (2002)
 Raajapattam (2001)
 The Gift of God (2001)
 Chithrathoonukal (2001)
 Mele Vaaryathe Maaalaakhakkuttikal (2000)
 Priyam(2000)
 Mark Antony (2000)
 India Gate (2000)
 Summer Palace (2000)
 Indriyam (2000)
 Holi (1999)
 Thennaali Raman (1999)
 Aakasha Ganga (1999)
 Pranaya Nilavu (1999)
 Swastham Grihabaranam (1999)
 James Bond (1999)
 Manthrimaalikayil Manassammatham (1998)
 Kudumba Vaarthakal (1998)
 Aalibabayum Aarara Kallanmarum (1998)
 Grama Panchayath (1998)
 Kottaram Veettile Apputtan (1998)
 Mayilpeelikkavu (1998)
 Oro Viliyum Kathorthu (1998)
 Kalaapam (1998)
 Sreekrishnapurathe Nakshathrathilakkam (1998)
 Chandralekha (1997)
 Gajaraja Manthram (1997)
 Junior Mandrake (1997)
 Bharatheeyam (1997)
 Raajathanthram (1997)
 Shaanthipuram Thampuraan (1997)
 Ullasapoongattu(1997)
 Kavaadam (1996)
 Vanarasena (1996)
 Vrudhanmare Sookshikkuka (1995)
 Radholsavam (1995)
 Mangalyasoothram (1995)
 Manathe Kottaram (1994)
 Thenmavin Kombath (1994)
 Kaazhchakkappuram (1992)

Background score
 Abhiyum Njanum
 Malayali
 Chathikkatha Chanthu

References

External links 
 
 Berny Ignatious at Oneindia.in
 Berny Ignatious at Raaga.com

Indian Roman Catholics
Living people
Malayalam film score composers
Indian musical duos
20th-century Indian musicians
Indian male film score composers
20th-century male musicians
Year of birth missing (living people)